Silk is a natural fibre and a textile woven from it.

Silk or Silks may also refer to:

Arts and entertainment
Silk (novel), a novel by Alessandro Baricco
Silk, a novel by Caitlín R. Kiernan
Silk (group), an American R&B group
Silk, a Philadelphia International Records funk group sampled by LF System on their number one hit "Afraid to Feel"
Silk music, a progressive house music label founded in Moscow in 2008 and acquired in 2021 by Monstercat

Fictional characters
Silk (comics), a fictional superhero in the Marvel Universe
Coleman Silk, a character in The Human Stain
Doctor Silk, a character in Ninjak
Patera Silk, a character in The Book of the Long Sun
Silk or Prince Kheldar of Drasnia, a character in The Belgariad and The Malloreon

Film and television
Silk (2006 film), a Taiwanese horror film
Silk (2007 film), a drama starring Keira Knightley, based on Alessandro Baricco's novel
Silk (TV series), a British TV series about barristers
Silk, a BBC Two '1991–2001' ident

People

Nickname or stage name
Silk or Jamaal Wilkes (born 1952), American former basketball player
Steve "Silk" Hurley (born 1962), American house-music producer
(Francis) Silk O'Loughlin (1872–1918), American Major League Baseball umpire
Silk Smitha (Vijayalakshmi Vadlapati, 1960–1996), South Indian cinema actress

Surname
Alexandra Silk (born 1963), American pornographic actress
Anna Silk (born 1974), Canadian television and film actress
Dennis Silk (1931–2019), British schoolmaster and international cricketer
Garnett Silk (1966–1994), Jamaican reggae musician
Gary Silk (born 1984), English footballer
George Silk (1916–2004), New Zealand photojournalist
Ilkay Silk (born 1948), Cypriot-born British and Canadian theatre artist
Joseph Silk (born 1942), American professor and astronomer
Mark Silk (born 1950), professor of religion in public life at Trinity College (Hartford, Connecticut)
Paul Silk, British civil servant

Other uses
Amazon Silk, a web browser developed by Amazon for Kindle Fire
SILK, an audio compression format and codec
Silk (brand), a brand of soy milk
Aerial silk, an apparatus used in aerial acrobatics
Corn silk, fibres in maize
King's Counsel, a class of British lawyers often colloquially called "silks" for the silk gowns they wear
Racing silks, racing colours worn by jockeys
Spider silk, silk produced by spiders, used in making webs
Steel Industries Limited Kerala, a company

See also
Robert Kilroy-Silk (born 1942), British former politician and TV presenter
Cilk, a programming language
Silkin, a surname
Silkk the Shocker, American rapper

English-language surnames